Adoxosia is a genus of moths in the subfamily Arctiinae.

Species
 Adoxosia excisa
 Adoxosia nydiana

References
Natural History Museum Lepidoptera generic names catalog

Lithosiini
Moth genera